Mareez is a 2004 biographical play about mid-twentieth century Gujarati poet Mareez, written by Vinit Shukla and directed by Manoj Shah. One of Shah's long-running productions, it premiered on 16 November 2004 at Prithvi Theatre, Mumbai.

Background
Directed by Manoj Shah and written by Vinit Shukla, the play narrates the life of Mareez. The play has been adapted by the author from Mareez's biography Mareez: Astitva Ane Vyaktitva (2001) written by Raeesh Maniar. The representation of Mareez has been influenced by Vincent van Gogh's autobiographical work Dear Theo and Charles Bukowski's biopic Barfly. The set features six paintings painted by Gulam Mohammed Sheikh.

The play premiered on 16 November 2004 at Prithvi Theatre, Mumbai.

Cast and characters
The original cast included:

Dharmendra Gohil as Mareez
Nayan Shukla as Mohsin, Mareez's son
Ishan Doshi as young Mohsin
Kumkum Das as Sona, Mareez's wife
Jay Upadhaya as Thakur
Aishwarya Mehta as Rabab, Mareez's girlfriend
Dayashamkar Pandey as Saadat Hasan Manto
Darshan Pandya as Indra
Pulkit Solanki
Pratik Gandhi
Rajive Bhatt
Shamath Mazumdar
Akash Desi
Hussaini Davawala
Pradeep Vegurlekar
Ashok Parmar

Reception
Mareez is one of Shah's long-running productions.

Utpal Bhayani was impressed by Dharmendra Gohil's acting and called "Mareez was in his veins". He also praised director and writer for connecting Mareez with Manto and Ghalib. He also praised performances of Dayashankar Pande, Nayan Shukla and Kumkum Das. He also praised costumes, production, music, audios, backdrops and lighting. He found Mareez's Mushairas with other poets from which he became well known, missing from the play.

Deepa Punjani of Mumbai Theatre Guide praised the performances, direction, writing and production. She found the presentation of various phases of Mareez's life interesting and engaging. She found the "drama of Mareez's life indulgent" but found the play "fresh" and important for literature and performance.

Journalist Ashish Vashi praised Dharmendra Gohil's performance and called it "most remarkable and mesmerizing aspect of the play".

References

2004 plays
Biographical plays about writers
Gujarati-language plays
Plays set in the 20th century
Plays set in India
Plays based on books
Cultural depictions of Indian men
Cultural depictions of poets